Pencolide is a maleimide isolate of Penicillium and seaweed endophytic fungi.

References

Maleimides
Carboxylic acids